Karl Friedrich Edler von Rennenkampff (Karl-Fridrikh Pavlovich Rennenkampf) was a Baltic German statesman and general of the Imperial Russian Army. Like many other soldiers at the time, Rennenkampff participated in the Russian Campaign in 1812 against Napoleon, distinguishing him during the  war including the Bautzen, along his cousin Paul, who also participated in the Battle of Bautzen. He also served as the vice-director of the Imperial Military Academy form 1843 until his death in 1848. He was the great-uncle of the famous World War I general Paul von Rennenkampf.

Notes

Citations

Sources
 Genealogical Handbook of the Baltic Knighthoods Part 1, 2: Livonia, Lfg. 9-15. Görlitz (1929)
 Welding, Olaf. Baltic German Biographical Dictionary 1710-1960. (1970), from the Baltic Biographical Dictionary Digital 

Imperial Russian Army generals
1788 births
1848 deaths
Baltic-German people
Russian military personnel of the Napoleonic Wars